HMAS Bundaberg (ACPB 91), named after the city of Bundaberg, was an Armidale class patrol boat of the Royal Australian Navy (RAN). The ship was built in Henderson, Western Australia, and was commissioned into the RAN in March 2007. In addition, the patrol boat was involved in several national and multinational training exercises, visited Vanuatu in 2011 (the vessel's only overseas deployment), tracked a suspected drug-smuggling vessel that led to a multimillion-dollar seizure, and participated in the International Fleet Review 2013. In August 2014, a large fire broke out on the ship while she was undergoing refit. Extensive damage from the fire led to the ship's decommissioning in December 2014.

Design and construction

The semi-displacement vee hull is fabricated from aluminium alloy, and each vessel is built to a combination of Det Norske Veritas standards for high-speed light craft and RAN requirements.

The main armament of the Armidale class is a Rafael Typhoon stabilised  gun mount fitted with an M242 Bushmaster cannon. Two  machine guns are also carried. Boarding operations are performed by two , waterjet propelled rigid-hulled inflatable boats (RHIBs). Each RHIB is stored in a dedicated cradle and davit, and is capable of operating independently from the patrol boat as it carries its own communications, navigation, and safety equipment.

Each patrol boat has a standard ship's company of 21 personnel, with a maximum of 29. The Armidales do not have a permanently assigned ship's company; instead, they are assigned to divisions at a ratio of two vessels to three companies, which rotate through the vessels and allow the Armidales to spend more time at sea, without compromising sailors' rest time or training requirements. A 20-berth auxiliary accommodation compartment was included in the design for the transportation of soldiers, illegal fishermen, or unauthorised arrivals; in the latter two cases, the compartment could be secured from the outside. However, a malfunction in the sewerage treatment facilities aboard  in August 2006 pumped hydrogen sulfide and carbon monoxide into the compartment, non-fatally poisoning four sailors working inside, after which use of the compartment for accommodation was banned across the class.

Bundaberg was constructed by Austal in Henderson, Western Australia. She was commissioned into the RAN in her namesake city on 3 March 2007.

Operational history
After commissioning and a schedule of work-up exercises, she was deployed as part of Operation Resolute for the first time in April 2007. Regular deployments as part of Operation Resolute made up the bulk of the patrol boat's operations during her career.

Bundaberg took part in Exercise Talisman Sabre during June 2007. After the exercise, the first boarding of an illegal foreign fishing vessel was made by Bundabergs personnel. In July, the ship's company participated in the City of Bundaberg's Bundy In Bloom festival, and were granted the keys to the city. In October, the ship rescued the crew of a capsized yacht off Mindil Beach, Northern Territory. On 4 January 2008, Bundaberg was forced to sail from Darwin to avoid being caught in confined waters by Cyclone Helen.

During May and June 2010, Bundaberg was temporarily removed from Operation Resolute to participate in a Minor War Vessel Concentration Period, before visiting Bundaberg and the Gold Coast. In November, the patrol boat was part of the annual Australia - Papua New Guinea Exercise Paradise. On 4 December, the ship was undergoing routine maintenance in Darwin when a fire started in a storeroom on board. There were no injuries, but damage to Bundaberg kept her out of operation until mid-April 2011. Shortly after returning to service, 
Bundaberg sailed overseas for the first and only time: a four-day visit to Port Villa, Vanuatu, which saw the patrol boat leave Cairns on 28 April 2011, and return on 8 May. In October, Bundaberg tracked the yacht Friday Freedom as part of an Australian Customs and Australian Federal Police (AFP) anti-smuggling operation.

In November 2012, Bundaberg was a part of Exercise Paradise/Triton Thunder. On 22 September, Bundaberg sailed from Cairns to Sydney, escorting four Pacific-class patrol boats which were to participate in the International Fleet Review 2013. Bundaberg was also a participant in the review: on 4 October, she was part of the 100th anniversary re-enactment of the RAN's first fleet entry into Sydney Harbour, then on 5 November, sailed into Sydney Harbour again as part of Review Line 2 for the fleet review itself.

Fire
During August 2014, the patrol boat was undergoing refit work at Aluminium Boats Australia (ABA), a civilian shipyard in Hemmant, Queensland. Before midday on 11 August 2014, a large fire broke out aboard, starting in a forward interior section and moving aft. The Queensland Fire and Emergency Services (QFES) were alerted at 11:52, but it was not until 17:00 that the fire was extinguished, and over the course of the afternoon, 15 fire appliances and over 60 firefighters attended the scene. Two civilian contractors were treated for smoke inhalation, and no other injuries were reported. Financial difficulties following the fire (including the loss of the naval repair contract, the cost of investigating the fire, and industry-wide pressure from imports of foreign-built vessels) culminated in ABA being placed into voluntary administration on 4 November 2014.  2014, no cause for the fire had been identified, although the QFES speculated at the time of the incident that repair work was responsible.

The ship was extensively damaged in the blaze, and on 18 December 2014, Bundaberg was ceremonially decommissioned at the naval base , with the patrol boat's ensign lowered for the final time from the base's flagstaff.

Citations

References

Books

 The chapter is available separately as Semaphore, Issue 4, 2006 in PDF and HTML formats.

Journal articles

News articles

Press releases

Websites

Ships built by Austal
Armidale-class patrol boats
2007 ships
Maritime incidents in 2014